The first ever Guildford Borough Council full-council elections were held on 7 June 1973.  The Conservatives won control of the council with a majority of 16, winning 29 of the 42 seats.

The Local Government Act 1972 decreed that a new Guildford Borough Council was to replace the previous two councils for the area, namely the town council, Guildford Municipal Borough Council, and the council for the rural area surrounding Guildford,  Guildford Rural District Council.  The wards used for this election were largely based on the previously wards used by Guildford Municipal Borough Council and the parish boundaries of Guildford Rural District Council.

There was some alteration to the wards in the run up to the election, but full scale rewarding would only be implemented in time for the 1976 council elections.  Changes included Friary ward and St Nicolas ward being merged with 3 councillors for the new joint ward; they had previously been separate wards with 3 councillors each on Guildford Municipal Borough Council.  Holy Trinity ward and Stoughton ward each saw the number of councillors represent them reduce from 3 to 2.  Merrow and Burpham ward, which at this point included much of what was from 1976 onwards to become the Christchurch ward, saw its representation increase from 3 to 5 councillors.

The new council was initially to be elected once every 3 years (this was to change to once every 4 years from 1979 onwards).  This replaced the annual elections, where one third of councillors were elected each year, which had previously been used for elections to Guildford Municipal Borough Council.

Going into the election the councillors for the town wards under the old Guildford Municipal Borough Council were as follows - 
Friary (2 Lib, 1 Lab), St Nicolas (2 Lib, 1 Con), Stoke (3 Lab), Westborough (3 Lab), Holy Trinity (3 Con), Merrow & Burpham (3 Con), Onslow (3 Con), Stoughton (3 Con).  Thus Friary & St Nicolas was predominantly Liberal, Stoke and Westborough were Labour plus Holy Trinity, Merrow & Burpham, Onslow and Stoughton were Conservative going into the election.  With one exception those allegiances were maintained in the 1973 council elections.

The Liberals took all 3 councillors for the new Friary & St Nicolas ward.  Labour retained all 6 councillors in its two strongholds Stoke and Westborough.  The Conservatives won all the seats in Merrow & Burpham, Onslow and Stoughton wards.  However, in Holy Trinity ward a change to previous voting behaviour occurred in that an official Liberal Party candidate took a seat for the first time in Holy Trinity's history; the ward having been created in 1899.  This resulted in Holy Trinity ward being split 1 Conservative, 1 Liberal.

All bar 3 of the councillors elected for wards within the area formerly covered by Guildford Rural District Council were Conservatives.  The three exceptions were 2 Independents were returned for Albury, Shere & St Martha's, plus one of the three councillors elected for East Clandon, West Clandon, East Horsley & West Horsley was a Liberal, the other two being Conservatives.

Overall the election results were Conservatives 29, Labour 6, Liberals 5, Independents 2.

Results

References

1973
1973 English local elections
1970s in Surrey